Donald Paul Werner (born March 8, 1953) is a retired Major League Baseball catcher. He played during seven seasons at the major league level, playing for the Cincinnati Reds and Texas Rangers (baseball). In 1978, the Reds starting catcher, Johnny Bench, sat out 20 plus games with an injury which gave Don a starting role. On June 16 of the same year he caught the only no-hitter of Hall of Famer Tom Seaver's career. He was drafted by the Reds in the 5th round of the  amateur draft after graduating from Appleton East High School.

Coaching
Since retiring as a player, he has been a minor league manager and coach. Werner was in the San Diego Padres chain for seven seasons.  He joined the Baltimore Orioles organization as coach of the Delmarva Shorebirds in 2003–2004.  He was the skipper of the Bowie Baysox in 2005–2006. After the 2006 season he was named minor league catching instructor for the Orioles. On June 20, 2011, he was named bullpen coach for the Baltimore Orioles, replacing Rick Adair, who had been promoted to  interim pitching coach following the resignation of then pitching coach Mark Connor.

Werner then resumed his former post of minor league catching instructor for Baltimore in 2012.

External links
, or Retrosheet, or Pura Pelota

1953 births
Living people
Baseball players from Wisconsin
Birmingham Barons players
Cincinnati Reds players
Denver Bears players
Gulf Coast Reds players
Idaho Falls Braves players
Indianapolis Indians players
Iowa Cubs players
Major League Baseball catchers
Minor league baseball coaches
Minor league baseball managers
Nashville Sounds players
Oklahoma City 89ers players
Richmond Braves players
San Diego Padres scouts
Sportspeople from Appleton, Wisconsin
Tampa Tarpons (1957–1987) players
Texas Rangers players
Tigres de Aragua players
American expatriate baseball players in Venezuela
Trois-Rivières Aigles players
Wichita Aeros players
Appleton East High School alumni